The Little Schuylkill River is a  tributary of the Schuylkill River in Northeastern Pennsylvania.

It rises south of McAdoo Heights near Haddock, Kline Township in Schuylkill County, Pennsylvania, on top of Broad Mountain. It flows south, then southwest passing through the communities of Tamaqua and New Ringgold. The river joins the Schuylkill River near Port Clinton west of Hawk Mountain. The Pennsylvania Fish and Boat Commission has designated several parts of the stream special trout stocking areas.

History of Name
The Little Schuylkill River was known as the Tamauguay Creek or River in the 18th and early to mid 19th centuries.  This name derives from the Lenni Lenape word for “beaver” (tëmakwe or tamaqua) and also the Lenni Lenape method for using “hunter’s hints” thus identifying it as the “place of the beavers”.  As the land became settled by Europeans, this Schuylkill River tributary was then referred to as the Little Schuylkill River – Schuylkill coming from the Dutch language meaning “hidden river”.

Tributaries
Indian Run
 Rattling Run
Lofty Creek
Locust Creek
 Panther Creek
 Wabash Creek
 Owl Creek
 Cold Run
Koenigs Creek
 Brushy Run
 Swamp Run
 Rabbit Run
 Still Creek
 Pine Creek

See also
List of Pennsylvania rivers

References

https://web.archive.org/web/20110928231631/http://www.fish.state.pa.us/trout_repro.pdf
New Ringgold 7.5 Minute Quadrangle, Department of the Interior, USGS

External links
U.S. Geological Survey: PA stream gaging stations

Rivers of Pennsylvania
Tributaries of the Schuylkill River
Rivers of Schuylkill County, Pennsylvania